Cui, alternatively spelled Tsui or Tsway, is one of the 80 most common surnames in China, with around 0.28% of the Chinese population having the surname (around 3.4 million in 2002).  It is also one of the most common surnames in Korea, with around 4.7% of the population having the surname in South Korea (2.4 million in 2013).

In China, Cui is commonly found in Shandong and Henan, as well as provinces in the northeast and other areas of China, such as Heilongjiang, Liaoning, Hebei,  Jiangsu, Shanxi, and Jilin.  It is romanized as Chui in Hong Kong and Macao (Cantonese), Choi in Macao (Cantonese) and Malaysia, Choi in Korean, Thôi in Vietnamese and Tsoi in Cyrillic.

Origin
One origin of the surname came from descendants of someone who originally held the Jiang (姜) surname in the state of Qi, founded by Jiang Ziya (姜子牙).  A grandson of Jiang Ziya named Jizi (季子), an heir apparent, chose to relinquish his claim to the throne in favour of his brother Shuyi (叔乙), and went to live in the Cui estate (崔邑, in present-day Shandong).  His descendants later adopted Cui as their surname.

During the Tang dynasty the Li family of Zhaojun 赵郡李氏, the Cui family of Boling 博陵崔氏, the Cui family of Qinghe 清河崔氏, the Lu family of Fanyang 范陽盧氏, the Zheng family of Xingyang 荥阳郑氏, the Wang family of Taiyuan 太原王氏, and the Li family of Longxi 隴西李氏 were the seven noble families between whom marriage was banned by law. Moriya Mitsuo wrote a history of the Later Han-Tang period of the Taiyuan Wang. Among the strongest families was the Taiyuan Wang. The prohibition on marriage between the clans issued in 659 by the Gaozong Emperor was flouted by the seven families since a woman of the Boling Cui married a member of the Taiyuan Wang, giving birth to the poet Wang Wei. He was the son of Wang Chulian who in turn was the son of Wang Zhou. The marriages between the families were performed clandestinely after the prohibition was implemented on the seven families by Gaozong. Their status as "Seven Great surnames" became known during Gaozong's rule.

The surname is one of the five surnames, now the most common surnames in Korea, closely associated with the six villages that formed the earliest state of Silla.

Many non-Han Chinese groups adopted the surname Cui.  During the Qing dynasty, the Manchu clans Cuigiya Hala (sinicized as 崔佳氏) and Cuimulu Hala (崔穆鲁氏) simplified their names to Cui. The Manchu Cuigiya 崔佳氏 clan claimed that a Han Chinese founded their clan. A Mongol clan Cuijuk Hala (崔珠克氏) also adopted this surname during the Qing dynasty.  The surname may also be found amongst the Tujia (土家) people in Hunan, the Yi (彝) people in Yunnan, as well as the Mongols and Hui (回) people.

List of notable people

Historical
 Cui Yuan (Han dynasty) (77–142 or 78–143 AD), a minor figure from the Han dynasty
 Cui Yan (163 - 216), an official from late Eastern Han dynasty
 Lady Cui (Cao Wei), a noble woman from the Three Kingdoms period
 Cui Hao (d. 450), a statesman of the 5th century, Qinghe Cui family
 Cui Renshi ( – 649), a chancellor during the Tang dynasty
 Cui Dunli (596–656), a general and diplomat during the Tang dynasty
 Cui Zhiwen (627–683), a chancellor during the Tang dynasty
 Cui Shi (671–713), an official of the Tang dynasty, grandson of Cui Renshi
 Cui Cha (d. 689), a chancellor of the Tang dynasty
 Cui Hao (poet) (704–754), a poet
 Cui Yuan (705–768) (705–768), an official of the Chinese dynasty Tang dynasty
 Cui Riyong (673–722), an official of the Tang dynasty
 Cui Shenji, a chancellor during the Tang dynasty
 Cui Xuanwei (638–706), a chancellor during the Tang dynasty
 Cui Bai (mid 11th century), a Song dynasty painter
 Cui Zizhong (died 1644), a painter during the Ming dynasty
 Cui Yuanzong, chancellor during the Tang dynasty

Contemporary
 Cui Guanghao (b. 1979), a Chinese football player
 Cui Jian (b. 1961), rock musician known for the hit single Nothing to my name
 Cui Jinming (b. 1992), Chinese basketball player
 Cui Peng (b. 1987), football player
 Elizabeth Cui (born 1997), diver from New Zealand
 Victor Cui, ONE Fighting Championship CEO
 Shuguang Cui, American engineer
 Cui Xiaodi (b. 1989), Chinese ski mountaineer
 Cui Xingwu, officer in the army in the Second Sino-Japanese War
 Cui Yajie, Chinese engineer murdered in Singapore
 Cui Yingjie, migrant worker and convicted murderer
 Cui Yongyuan (b. 1963), talk show host
 Cui Yuying (b 1958), high-ranking propaganda official of Tibetan descent
 Cui Zhide (b. 1983), race walker
 Cui Zhiyuan (b. 1963), professor at Tsinghua University
 Cui Zi'en, film director and writer
 Jorge Maria Cui, Filipino Secretary General of the Boy Scouts of the Philippines 1975–1980
 Tsui Teh-li, member of the executive board of the Boy Scouts of China, 1980s
 Tsui Family, a prominent family in China's Shantung province during late Qing dynasty and Republic of China, and co-founding family of Tsingtao Beer

See also 
Choi (Korean version of the same surname)
Chui, occasional Cantonese romanization

References

External links
 崔 – Wiktionary

Chinese-language surnames